Marvin Emil Seidel (born 9 November 1995) is a German badminton player. He was the bronze medalist at the 2013 European Junior Championships in the boys' doubles, and a silver medalist at the 2021 European Championships in the men's doubles event.

Career 
In July 2021, Seidel competed at the 2020 Summer Olympics in the men's doubles partnered with Mark Lamsfuß, but he was eliminated in the group stage.

Achievements

European Championships 
Men's doubles

European Junior Championships 
Boys' doubles

BWF World Tour (1 title, 4 runners-up) 
The BWF World Tour, which was announced on 19 March 2017 and implemented in 2018, is a series of elite badminton tournaments sanctioned by the Badminton World Federation (BWF). The BWF World Tour is divided into levels of World Tour Finals, Super 1000, Super 750, Super 500, Super 300 (part of the HSBC World Tour), and the BWF Tour Super 100.

Men's doubles

Mixed doubles

BWF International Challenge/Series (4 titles, 3 runners-up) 
Men's doubles

Mixed doubles

  BWF International Challenge tournament
  BWF International Series tournament
  BWF Future Series tournament

References

External links 
 

1995 births
Living people
Sportspeople from Saarbrücken
German male badminton players
Badminton players at the 2020 Summer Olympics
Olympic badminton players of Germany
Badminton players at the 2019 European Games
European Games competitors for Germany